Delovak Athara (Sinhala, Between Two Worlds) is a 1966 Sri Lankan drama film directed by Dr. Lester James Peries, the screen play dialog and script by Dr. Tissa Abeysekara. The film stars Tony Ranasinghe and Suvineetha Weerasinghe in lead roles along with Jeevarani Kurukulasuriya and Wijeratne Warakagoda.

Peries developed the movie as a character study utilizing a single incident to provide insight into the newly rich society of Sri Lanka in the time period. It proved to be his most successful film up to that time, surpassing Gamperaliya in box office earnings. It was also a critical success, winning praise from Sinhala critics like Philip Cooray and making the rounds at European film festivals, including the Valladolid Film Festival in Spain.

The film was re-screened on 21 July 2018 at 4.30 pm at the Regal Cinema in Kandy for the Sarasaviya Film Festival.

Plot 
At the onset of the film, Nissanka (Tony Ranasinghe) is engaged to marry Shiranee (Jeevarani Kurukulasuriya), a woman of the same social class. Nissanka decides to go to a club and asks Shiranee who politely declines. He thus goes alone and meets an old friend Chitra (Suwineetha Abeysekera). They rekindle their friendship and Nissanka offers a ride home. Chitra agrees and they set off only to accidentally hit and kill a pedestrian. The two now have a large secret as they flee the scene. Nissanka's family subsequently attempts to cover up the murder. Chitra is faced with a moral dilemma but doesn't give Nissanka up the police. She urges him to turn himself in. One man who had seen Nissanka's car when it hit the pedestrian, tells the police the numbers of the number plate. The police inquires into this and questions Nissanka too. Nissanka's father tells the police that his servant drew the car and the servant is also questioned by the police. One day the servant sees that the pedestrian had passed away so he runs away to his village The policemen go to his village and arrest him. Meanwhile, mounting tensions and conflicts exacerbate the already tense situation, making Nissanka's life unbearable. He finally decides to go to the police with Chitra and confess what he had done.

Cast 
 Tony Ranasinghe as Nissanka Wijesinghe
 Suvineetha Weerasinghe as Chitra Karunaratne
 Jeevarani Kurukulasuriya as Shiranee Gunasekara
 Iranganie Serasinghe as Clara Wijesinghe, Nissanka's mother
 J. B. L. Gunasekera as Herbert Wijesinghe, Nissanka's father
 Winston Serasinghe as Francis Gunasekara, Shiranee's father
 Somapala Dharmapriya as Martin
 Sujatha Jayawardena as Mrs. Gunasekara, Shiranee's mother 
 Wijeratne Warakagoda as Police Inspector
 Kithsiri Perera as Asoka
 Nawanandana Wijesinghe as Drunk witness
 Thilakasiri Fernando as Andiris 'Appu'
 Sunila Abeysekera as Chitra's niece
 Premini Gunaratne as Chitra's sister
 G. W. Surendra as Office newspaper reader
 Shirani Gunathilaka as Drama performer
 Sujatha Paramanathan as Drama performer
 Shirani Kurukulasuriya as Drama performer
 Lillian de Abrew as Drama performer
 Shanthi Lekha as Accident victim's Amma
 Asoka Peiris as Factory walker
 Wickrama Bogoda
 Tissa Abeysekara
 Bernard Ranasinghe
 Elson Divithuragama

References

External links 
 

1966 films
Films directed by Lester James Peries
1966 drama films
Sri Lankan drama films